The Social Party Imberakuri (PS-Imberakuri), is a political party in Rwanda. "Imberakuri" in the name of the party translates as "supporter of truth". The party opposes the government of Paul Kagame.

History
The party was formed by Bernard Ntaganda on 14 December 2008 after he left the Social Democratic Party. Due to what the government ruled were illegal demonstrations, party leaders including Ntaganda were arrested on 24 June 2010 and released on 9 July 2010, although Ntaganda was denied bail, and sentenced to four years in prison in 2011. He was released in 2014.

The party contested the 2013 parliamentary elections, failing to win a seat. However, it entered parliament after winning two seats in the 2018 elections.

References

External links

Political parties in Rwanda
2008 establishments in Rwanda
Political parties established in 2008